Allied Dunbar was a large British life assurance group. In its early years it was known as Hambro Life Assurance and was listed on the London Stock Exchange and was once a constituent of the FTSE 100 Index. However, it was acquired by BAT Industries, merged with Eagle Star, and sold to Zurich Financial Services in 1998.

History
The company was founded by Sir Mark Weinberg, Lord Joffe and Sir Sydney Lipworth after Abbey Life was taken over, with seed finance from Hambros Bank, and set up its headquarters in Swindon town centre in 1970 under the name Hambro Life Assurance. It was first listed on the London Stock Exchange in 1975. The company expanded its financial adviser operations during the late 1970s and early 1980s, acquiring the Allied Unit Trusts of which it was soon the major unitholder, to become 'Allied Hambro' in 1984. The company became 'Allied Dunbar' in 1985 after it purchased Dunbar & Co., a small private bank, following the acquisition by BAT Industries. The asset management department was hived off to form Threadneedle Investments, and it was bought out by Zurich Financial Services in 1998.

Its direct sales force became the 'Zurich Advice Network' (ZAN) in 2001. In 2005 and following changes in industry regulation ZAN evolved into a stand-alone entity known as Openwork—a directly authorised multi-tiered financial distribution network.

Allied Dunbar operated a large conference centre as King Edward's Place in Foxhill, near Swindon, which was sold to be a hotel following the closure of the direct sales operation.

Business model

Allied Dunbar's business, like its predecessor Abbey Life's, was unit-linked: the direct investment risk and reward due to market changes was very largely exclusive to the individual investors, rather than the company, its shareholders or other planholders. Despite its initial form as an Assurance Company, Allied Dunbar was always essentially a retail investment group.

Its initial sales proposition was to offer unit-linked bonds, which could be sold door-to-door (unlike unit trusts at the time), and including property investment, when property unit trusts were not then authorised. Although nominally single-premium life policies, these offered only nominal life cover, and incidentally neatly avoided the liability to ad valorem stamp duty on life policies. Equity exposure was obtained by investing via a range of feeder funds into Allied Unit Trusts, whose manager was owned by Hambros; and property via Berkeley Hambro.

As far as possible, Allied Dunbar avoided all direct financial exposure to policyholder funds and liabilities. The company took the minimum responsibility for its sales force, even after tied agents were regulated under the Financial Services Act 1986, and the hard-sell tactics of some of its self-employed "sales associates", soon gave it the soubriquet of 'Allied Crowbar'. The company's financial responsibility for the sales force, in the form of "indemnity commission" paid in advance to profits accruing from premium payments, was largely passed back to its self-employed sales managers. Most mortality risk was reassured, and every other kind of risk was ruthlessly designed out or managed out as far as practicable; the company was thus highly successful in comparison with traditional life offices.

To take advantage of regulatory, tax and trust law, the group was successively expanded to provide pensions, investment bonds, unit trusts, banking services, and offshore policies.

Endowment complaints 

Over the period May 2001 to April 2003, a portion of the nearly 300,000 Allied Dunbar customers who had been sold endowment mortgages made complaints. These complaints were prompted by a fall in the market (which meant that nearly nine in ten of their accounts were likely to suffer maturity value and mortgage repayment shortfalls) as well as new regulations which required that customers be notified semi-annually of the projected earnings of the endowment, with particular regard to such shortfalls. Around 1,000 such complaints were rejected during the above period. The Financial Services Authority investigated the rejected complaints, as well as Allied Dunbar's internal procedures for handling such customer complaints, and while maintaining a majority of them, it fined the company £725,000 on 11 March 2004 for mishandling such complaints.
In its decision, the Financial Services Authority noted that:

Allied Dunbar stopped writing endowment mortgages in November 2001. It was not the only company fined by the FSA, and at the time this was only the fifth-largest fine for offences related to endowment complaint mismanagement. Friends Provident had been fined £625,000 in November 2003, and five other firms had previously been fined a total of £5.2 million for their mismanagement of such complaints. The largest fine fell to Royal Scottish Assurance, which incurred a £2m penalty.

See also
Kevin Ronaldson

References 

Insurance companies of the United Kingdom
Companies based in Swindon
Financial services companies established in 1970
Companies formerly listed on the London Stock Exchange
Zurich Insurance Group
Financial services companies disestablished in 1998
1970 establishments in England
1998 disestablishments in England
1998 mergers and acquisitions